Sir Samuel Toller (1764–1821) was an English advocate-general of Madras and legal writer.

Life
He was son of Thomas Toller (1732–1795), who succeeded his father-in-law, Samuel Lawrence, as preacher to the Presbyterian congregation in Monkwell Street, London. He was educated at Charterhouse School.

Toller was admitted to Lincoln's Inn 27 March 1781, was called to the bar, and in March 1812 was appointed Advocate-General of Madras. He was subsequently knighted, and died in India on his way to Bangalore on 19 November 1821.

Works
Toller was the author of two legal works:

 The Law of Executors and Administrators, London, 1800; 7th ed. by Francis Whitmarsh, 1838; 2nd American edit. by T. F. Gordon, Philadelphia, 1824, 3rd American edit. by E. D. Ingraham, 1834.
 Treatise of the Law of Tithes: compiled in Part from some Notes of Richard Wooddeson, London, 1808; 3rd ed. 1822.

Family
In 1793 Toller married Miss Cory of Cambridge, sister of Robert Towerson Cory, by whom he had issue.

Notes

Attribution

1764 births
1821 deaths
English barristers
English legal writers
People educated at Charterhouse School
Members of Lincoln's Inn
British people in colonial India